Douglas Raymond Acomb (born May 15, 1949) is a Canadian former professional ice hockey player. He played 2 games in the National Hockey League with the Toronto Maple Leafs during the 1969–70 season. The rest of his career, which lasted from 1969 to 1976, was mainly spent in the senior Ontario Hockey Association.

Playing career
Acomb played two games in the NHL for the Toronto Maple Leafs managing one assist. He later played in amateur senior hockey for the Barrie Flyers.

Post-retirement
He later lived in Markham, Ontario with his wife, four daughters, and two sons. He worked as a high school teacher and hockey coach.

Career statistics

Regular season and playoffs

External links
 

1949 births
Living people
Buffalo Bisons (AHL) players
Canadian expatriate ice hockey players in Austria
Canadian expatriate ice hockey players in the United States
Canadian ice hockey left wingers
Canadian schoolteachers
Ontario Hockey Association Senior A League (1890–1979) players
Phoenix Roadrunners (WHL) players
Port Huron Flags (IHL) players
Ice hockey people from Toronto
Toronto Maple Leafs players
Toronto Marlboros players
Tulsa Oilers (1964–1984) players
Wiener EV players